Pângărați is a commune in Neamț County, Western Moldavia, Romania. It is composed of six villages: Oanțu, Pângărați, Pângărăcior, Poiana, Preluca, and Stejaru.

The mountains are separated by the river Bistrița, to which converge on the left the tributaries Stejaru, Pângărați, and Pângărăcior and on the right the river Oanțu. 

In Stejaru village there is the Dimitrie Leonida hydroelectric power plant, which is fed from Lake Izvorul Muntelui by a tunnel dug through Botoșanu Mountain.

The commune is crossed by the national road , which connects it to the town of Bicaz,  to the west, and to the county seat, Piatra Neamț,  to the east. The Bacău–Bicaz CFR railway also passes through the commune, which is served by the Pângărați station and the Stejaru passenger stop.

The , which currently houses 36 monks, was built in 1560 by ktitor Alexandru Lăpușneanu, ruler of Moldavia.

Natives
 Neculai Onțanu (born 1949), politician
 Nicu Stroia (born 1971), gymnast

References

Communes in Neamț County
Localities in Western Moldavia